Andrew Sherborne (born 11 March 1961) is an English professional golfer.

Sherborne was born in Bristol. He was the leading amateur at The Open Championship in 1984 and turned professional later that year. He played on the European Tour for nearly twenty years, winning the 1991 Madrid Open and the 1992 Peugeot Spanish Open. Towards the end of his tournament career he struggled to hold his place on the main tour, and during this period he picked up his third professional win at the Challenge Tour's 2001 Open Golf Montecchia - PGA Triveneta. His highest placing on the European Tour's Order of Merit was 30th in 1992.

Professional wins (4)

European Tour wins (2)

Challenge Tour wins (1)

Challenge Tour playoff record (0–1)

Other wins (1)
2011 Farmfoods British Par 3 Championship

Results in major championships

Note: Sherborne only played in The Open Championship.

CUT = missed the half-way cut (3rd round cut in 1984 Open Championship)
"T" = tied

Team appearances
Amateur
European Youths' Team Championship (representing England): 1982
St Andrews Trophy (representing Great Britain & Ireland): 1984 (winners)

References

External links

English male golfers
European Tour golfers
1961 births
Living people